Henry Fuchs is an American academic.

Henry Fuchs may also refer to:

Henry Fuchs (baseball) (1879–1947), also known as Jacob Fox, American baseball player
Henry Fuchs, born Henryk Tauber (1917–2000), Holocaust survivor